Samu Pecz (born as Petz, Pest, 1 March 1854 – Budapest, 1 September 1922) was a Hungarian architect and academic.

Career
Pecz studied at a number of universities both at home and abroad in Stuttgart,  later at the Vienna Academy of Fine Arts under the Danish architect Theophil Hansen, the builder of the Austrian Parliament Building, Musikverein, and Stock Exchange buildings in Vienna.

After returning to Budapest he worked with Frigyes Schulek on the Matthias Church in Buda and later in the offices of Alajos Hauszmann. At this time he familiarised himself with Gothic architecture, particularly in church design. Later, Pecz worked in the technical university under Schulek and Imre Steindl and became a lecturer is 1887. He was 34 years old when he became the dean of the building faculty which he continued to be until his death. He designed numerous buildings in the historicist tradition, often employing Zsolnay tiles to rich effect.

Main works

Country

Dévaványa: Reformed Church
Debrecen: Reformed Church on Kossuth Street
Nagyvárad (now Oradea, Romania): Lutheran church
Kolozsvár (now Cluj-Napoca, Romania): Széki Palace

Budapest

District V: Unitarian Church and apartments on Nagy Ignác Street
District IX: Great Market Hall on Fővám Square
District I: National Archives building in Buda Castle
District I: Reformed Church on Szilágyi Dezső Square
District VII: Fasori Lutheran Church and Fasori Gimnázium
District XI: Technical University Library on Budafoki Street
District VIII: "Gólyavár" on Múzeum blvd.
District IX: Tenement house on Nagyvárad Square

Writings 
(in Hungarian)
 Introduction to Greek stonework (A görög kőszerkezetek ismertetése) (Budapest, 1886)
 On the development of ancient Christian architecture (Az ókeresztény templom-építészet fejlődése (Budapest, 1886)
 On the building of Protestant churches (A protestáns templomok építéséről) (Budapest, 1888)

Hungarian architects
People from Pest, Hungary
1854 births
1922 deaths
Academy of Fine Arts Vienna alumni
Danube-Swabian people